Territorial defense students are a military youth organization in Thailand under control of the Royal Thai Army, and recently the Royal Thai Navy and Royal Thai Air Force.

History

Prior to World War II the Yuwachon Thahan (or "junior soldiers", Thai: ยุวชนทหาร) or more commonly referred to as Territorial Defense (Thai: รักษาดินแดน shortened as ร.ด  in thai)were established in 1934 by Field Marshal Luang Pibulsonggram. At the beginning of World War II junior soldiers were sent to fight troops of the Japanese Empire that invaded southern Thailand on 8 December 1941.

At the end of the war the junior soldiers were disbanded, but Lieutenant General Luang Chatnakrop (พล.ท. หลวงชาตินักรบ) created the territorial defense students to replace them in 1948.

Requirements
 Thai nationality
 Age younger than 22 years
 Approval of parents or guardians
 A grade-point average above 2.50 or a certificate of passing senior scout
 A certificate of health. People with disabilities, fatal sickness, disease, or eye problems such as color blindness are not allowed.
 Body mass index of less than 35 for male, and less than 30 for female (obesity)
 Must have appropriate body height and size corresponding to age
 Passing a fitness test of an 800-meter run in 3 minutes 15 seconds, 34 sit-ups in two minutes, and 22 push-ups in two minutes. Female applicants have more relaxed requirements.
 Students are required to cut their hair so that the white of their scalp is visible on 3-sides, and a small patch of hair is visible on the top of the head.

Applicants who do not meet fitness test requirements are ranked by their scores. Applicants with higher scores have priority. Applicants who do not meet other criteria may be accepted in a case-by-case basis. Number of applicants is proportional to the funding.

Study

Royal Thai Army 
Territorial Defense students have to study 80 hours per year and attend a period of field training, but commonly only for Grade 2 through Grade 5 students. The students must have a perfect presence for training course and are not allowed to skip any exams. At the end of every semester territorial defense students have to pass an exam to continue their study at the next grade.

Territorial Defense students have to pass:
 Marksmanship test using a rifle, where the test parameters are related to grade
 Paper test of multiple-choice questions (Only for year 3 to 5 students)
 Physical test covering procedures, use of tools, and discipline learned during the year
Field training, for year 2 and above students.

Field training
Field training lengths (dependent on grade and gender of the student):
 Grade 2; male: three days
 Grade 3; male: five days
 Grade 4-5; male: seven days
 Grade 2-3; female: three days
 Grade 4-5; female: five days
Field training occurs at Khao Chon Kai Training Camp for Grade 2 and 3 students studying at a territorial defense training centre within the Bangkok Metropolitan Area or the central region of Thailand, and all Grade 4 and 5 students from throughout the country. For Grade 2 and 3 students studying in other areas, the field training occurs at the respective training centre's designated area.

Perks of graduation
Territorial defense students gain the following perks, depending on the training years they have passed.
 Students who complete Grade 1 are equivalent to private first class and their service period as conscript will be reduced by six months.
 Reduced by another six months, if voluntary.
 Students who complete Grade 2 are equivalent to corporal and their service period as conscript will be reduced down to one year.
 Reduced by another six months, if voluntary.
 Students who complete Grade 3 are equivalent to sergeant, and are exempt from conscription.
 Those who wish may request to use the said rank title.
 Students who complete Grade 4 are equivalent to staff sergeant.
 Students who complete Grade 5 and their bachelor's degree are commissioned as acting second lieutenants.
 As an equivalent of an off-duty commission officier, they are allowed to dress in officer uniform in any occasions (and carry sabres) as applicable.

In addition, they gain an additional total score when they take admission exams for application to military academies of the Armed Forces and the Police. Graduating the first grade gives 3 marks to add to total score, and one more mark is added for each subsequent years. (Up to 7 total marks)

Royal Thai Navy 

Territorial defense training was introduced in 2009 for the Royal Thai Navy, only for students and youth living nearby the Sattahip Naval Base in Chonburi Province. About 90 students are accepted each year and training is done at the Sattahip Naval Base. Upon reaching Grade 3, students will then further separate into one of the three smaller units operated separately by:
 The Royal Thai Marine Corps
 Coastal Defense Command
 Strategic Naval Command

Royal Thai Air Force 

Territorial defense training was introduced in 2006 and available until Grade 5 by 2010 for the Royal Thai Air Force, only for students studying in polytechnic colleges within the locale of the Don Muang Royal Thai Air Force Base, Bangkok. The study will involve only about the mechanical side of the air force only.

Small arms

Uniform and insignia

Army territorial defense students wear a khaki-green uniform and beret with the Army Reserve Command Insignia (Crossed swords under The Great Crown of Victory) on their collar, beret, and belt. Territorial defense students distinguish their school and province by the school's coat of arms on the right shoulder, and provincial badge on left breast. The name badge is sewn on the right chest.

Training years and rankings
Each student's training year can be distinguished by rectangular Thai Numeral ranging from 1 to 5 on a khaki-background tag. For command students, they are distinguished with colored background and pentagonal-shaped number tag. The official colorings are as follow.
 "Green": Squad Leader
 "Red": Platoon Leader
 "Light Blue": Company Leader

In practice, the command student's ranking can go up to battalion or even regiment. These off-document ranks employ off-document insignia such as armbands with text notation. Such notations can also be employed for lower positions, as command students do not inherit their status into the Field Training.

Special training
About 120 fourth grade territorial defense students who pass the physical test are allowed to enter the parasail training course. Requirements are, for males, 15 pull-ups with no time limit, 47 push-ups in two minutes, 65 sit-ups in two minutes, and a one-mile run in eight minutes. Female applicants have more relaxed requirements.

Battle of Tha Nang Sang Bridge

On the first day of the Japanese invasion of Southeast Asia (8 December 1941), the Japanese Army sent troops to many parts of Chumphon Province. At Ma Hat Bay, the Japanese forces landed on beaches stretching from Ban Pak Nam Chumphon to Ban Kho Son. The 38th Infantry Battalion of the Royal Thai Army, about 17 km away, was too far away to intercept the initial invaders in time. As a result, roughly 100 of the reserve students and the local police force had to hold the numerically superior Japanese army at bay from positions on the west side of Tha Nang Sang Bridge until the 38th Infantry could arrive.

The force of reserve students and policemen sent their 1st Light Machine Gun Company across the bridge at 08:00. They then went through Wat Tha Yang Tai to block any Japanese reinforcements. The commander of 38th Infantry wished to send his 4th Heavy Machine Gun Company across the bridge to protect the government buildings on the Tha Taphoa River, but the Japanese troops fired upon the Thai defenders from the other side of the river. The reserve students, under command of Captain Thawin Niyomsen, commander of the Chumphon Junior Soldiers Training Centre, charged cross the bridge to seize strategic points on the east side. Under heavy Japanese fire, Captain Thawin was killed when he attempted to find a new position for his light machine gun squad. The remaining students, now headed by Sergeant Samran Khuanphan from the training centre, were able to maintain their position, and waited for friendly reinforcements. Thailand, however, surrendered to Japan before noon.

See also
 ROTC
 University Officer Training Corps
 Cadet

References

External links
 Thai Army Reserve Command Center
 Reserve Affairs Center
 Territorial Defence School
 Reserve Affairs School

Military of Thailand
Military youth groups
Military education and training in Thailand